Putao is a town of Yangshuo County, Guangxi, China. , it administers Putao Residential Neighborhood and the following 11 villages:
Putao Village
Fuwang Village
Xiling Village
Zhouzhai Village
Yangmeiling Village
Xiayan Village
Dongcun Village
Bao'an Village
Lingpi Village
Malan Village
Renhe Village

References

Towns of Guilin
Yangshuo County